Cristian Ledesma may refer to:

Cristian Ledesma (footballer, born 1978), Argentine football defensive midfielder
Cristian Ledesma (footballer, born 1982), Italian football midfielder
Cristian Ledesma (footballer, born 1987), Paraguayan football striker for Deportivo Quito

See also
Christian Ledesma (born 1976), Argentine racing driver